The Solution and EU Party (Turkish: Çözüm ve AB Partisi) is a political party in Northern Cyprus without parliamentary representation.

Political parties in Northern Cyprus